The Fantasy Sports Writers Association (FSWA) is an organization that represents journalists in the United States who cover fantasy sports.  It was founded in 2004.  According to its website, the organization's mission is to "be a voice for writers in the arena of fantasy sports. Moreover, the organization, through its executive staff and board of directors, will strive to promote and acknowledge the hard work and dedication shown by fantasy sports writers throughout the industry." Andy Behrens serves as the President of the FSWA. The website can be found at www.FSWA.org

History 
The association was founded in 2004.  Ryan Houston  was the first president,  succeeded by   Kirk Bouyelas  in 2006, Mike Beacom in 2008,  and Andy Behrens in 2014.   Near the end of each calendar year, nominations are made through a blind process. A group of judges with teaching backgrounds and a familiarity with fantasy sports narrows down the submissions to a group of typically 3-5 finalists. A second group of judges then chooses the best submission in each category. The finalist is typically announced in January, with winners announced about a month later. In order to garner more of an audience for the industry awards, the last few have been broadcast live on Sirius XM radio's Fantasy Sports channel.

Writing Awards 
The Fantasy Sports Writers Association has been providing awards since 2004 to honor the industry's best writers. The awards are typically presented each January at a meeting of the organization in Las Vegas.  Many of the winners come from sites and publications dedicated to fantasy sports, while others come from general-purpose sports publications.

Past winners

Several members of the industry have been nominated for and won multiple awards. The leaders - by individual and media outlet - are listed below:

Hall of Fame 
In 2010, the FSWA established a Hall of Fame to honor fantasy sports writers, publishers, and editors "who possess a distinguished body of work and/or those who have helped to advance the careers of others in the fantasy sports industry."

The classes of writers inducted into the Hall of Fame are below.

References

External links
 Official website

Fantasy sports
American sports journalism organizations
Journalism-related professional associations